Communion is the fifth studio album by the Swedish band The Soundtrack of Our Lives.

The album is the band's longest to date at twenty-four tracks. After the decision was made to postpone the Origin Vol. 2 project, the band wrote entirely new material and recorded it, which became Communion.

Track listing

CD 1

CD 2

Personnel
Mattias Bärjed – guitar, backing vocals
Åke Karl Kalle Gustafsson Jerneholm – bass, backing vocals
Martin Hederos – piano, organ, backing vocals
Ebbot Lundberg – lead vocals, autoharp
Ian Person – guitar, backing vocals
Fredrik Sandsten – drums, percussion

Additional personnel
Simon Olsson – vocals on "Everything Beautiful Must Die" and "Utopia"
Midaircondo – intro on "Babel On" and appearance in various places
Nicola Boruvka – strings on "Songs of the Ocean" and "Lifeline"
Lotte Lybeck – strings on "Songs of the Ocean" and "Lifeline"
Karin Claesson – strings on "Songs of the Ocean" and "Lifeline"
Paula Gustaffon-Apola – strings on "Songs of the Ocean" and "Lifeline"
Stefan Sporsén – trumpet on "Fly" and "The Fan Who Wasn't There"

References

2008 albums
The Soundtrack of Our Lives albums